Eulitoma insignis is a species of sea snail, a marine gastropod mollusk in the family Eulimidae.

Distribution

This species occurs in the following locations:

 European waters (ERMS scope)

Description 
The maximum recorded shell length is 19 mm.

Habitat 
Minimum recorded depth is 774 m. Maximum recorded depth is 774 m.

References

Eulimidae
Gastropods described in 1896